Birch Creek (Łiteet'aii  in Gwich’in) is a census-designated place (CDP) in Yukon-Koyukuk Census Area, Alaska, United States. The population was 33 at the 2010 census, up from 28 in 2000.

Geography
Birch Creek is at  (66.256708, -145.815319).

Demographics

Birch Creek first appeared on the 1940 U.S. Census as an unincorporated (native) village. It did not appear again until the 1980 U.S. Census when it was made a census-designated place (CDP).

As of the census of 2000, there were 28 people, 11 households, and 7 families residing in the CDP. The population density was 4.6 people per square mile (1.8/km2). There were 22 housing units at an average density of 3.6/sq mi (1.4/km2). The racial makeup of the CDP was 100.00% Native American.

There were 11 households, out of which 54.5% had children under the age of 18 living with them, 9.1% were married couples living together, 45.5% had a female householder with no husband present, and 27.3% were non-families. 27.3% of all households were made up of individuals, and none had someone living alone who was 65 years of age or older. The average household size was 2.55 and the average family size was 2.63.

In the CDP, the population was spread out, with 28.6% under the age of 18, 14.3% from 18 to 24, 28.6% from 25 to 44, 28.6% from 45 to 64, . The median age was 34 years. For every 100 females, there were 115.4 males. For every 100 females age 18 and over, there were 100.0 males.

The median income for a household in the CDP was $11,250, and the median income for a family was $13,750. Males had a median income of $11,250 versus $0 for females. The per capita income for the CDP was $5,952. There were 33.3% of families and 37.0% of the population living below the poverty line, including 33.3% of under eighteens and none of those over 64.

Education
It was previously served by a school of the Yukon Flats School District.

References

Census-designated places in Alaska
Census-designated places in Unorganized Borough, Alaska
Census-designated places in Yukon–Koyukuk Census Area, Alaska